Lucas Cavalcante Silva Afonso (born 23 March 1996), known as Lucão, is a Brazilian professional footballer who plays for Guarani as a central defender.

Club career 
Lucão made his Série A debut at 17 November 2013 against Fluminense in a 2-1 away defeat. He played the first half and was substituted at half time by Caramelo.

Honours 
CSA
Campeonato Alagoano: 2021

Brazil U20
Toulon Tournament: 2013

References

External links

1996 births
Living people
Brazilian footballers
Brazilian expatriate footballers
Brazil under-20 international footballers
Brazil youth international footballers
Campeonato Brasileiro Série A players
Campeonato Brasileiro Série B players
Primeira Liga players
São Paulo FC players
G.D. Estoril Praia players
Goiás Esporte Clube players
Centro Sportivo Alagoano players
Mirassol Futebol Clube players
Brazilian expatriate sportspeople in Portugal
Expatriate footballers in Portugal
Footballers from Brasília
Association football midfielders